Aṣ-ṣaḥābah ("The Companions") were the companions of the Islamic prophet Muhammad who had seen or met him, believed in him at the time when he was alive and also died as Muslims. While all the Sahabah are very important in the Islamic faith, there are some which are especially notable and important. These include the first 4 Caliphs: Abu Bakr, Umar, Uthman, Ali.

A 
 Abu Bakr `Abdullah ibn Abi Quhafa
 Ali ibn Abi Talib
 Aqeel ibn Abi Talib
 Abdullah ibn Ja'far
 Abdur-Rahman ibn Abu Bakr
 Abdur-Rahman ibn Sakran
 Abd al-Rahman ibn Awf
 Abdullah ibn Abbas
 Abd-Allah ibn Abd-Allah ibn Ubayy
 'Abd Allah ibn 'Amr ibn al-'As
 Abdallah ibn Amir
 Abdullah ibn al-Zubayr
 Abdullah ibn Hudhafah as-Sahmi
 Abdullah ibn Jahsh
 Abdullah ibn Masud
 Abdullah ibn Suhayl
 Abd Allah ibn Hanzala
 Abd Allah ibn Mas'ada al-Fazari
 'Abd Allah ibn Rawahah
 Abdullah ibn Salam
 Abdullah ibn Unais
 Abdullah ibn Amr ibn Haram
 Abdullah ibn Zayd
 Abdullah ibn Umar
 Abd-Allah ibn Umm-Maktum
 Abdullah ibn Atik
 Abbad ibn Bishr
 Abu Basir
 Abu Darda
 Abū l-Ṭufayl ʿĀmir b. Wāthila al-Kinānī
 Abid ibn Hamal
 Abid ibn Hunay
 
 Abu al-Aas ibn al-Rabiah
 Abu Ayyub al-Ansari
 ‘Abbas ibn ‘Abd al-Muttalib
 Abu Dardaa
 Abû Dhar al-Ghifârî
 Abu Dujana
 Abu Fuhayra
 Abu Hudhaifah ibn Mughirah
 Abu-Hudhayfah ibn Utbah
 Abu Hurairah
 Abu Jandal ibn Suhail
 Abu Lubaba ibn Abd al-Mundhir
 Abu Musa al-Ashari
 Abu Qatada al-Ansari
 Abu Quhafa
 Abu Sa`id al-Khudri
 Abu Salama `Abd Allah ibn `Abd al-Asad
 Abu Sufyan ibn al-Harith
 Abu Sufyan ibn Harb
 Abu Ubaidah ibn al-Jarrah
 Abu Zama' al-Balaui
 
 
 Adî ibn Hâtim at-Tâî
 
 
 
 
 
 
 
 
 
 
 
 Ahzâb bin Usaid (pronounced with an alif)
 `Âisha bint Abî Bakr
 Al-'Ala' Al-Hadrami
 Al-Bara' ibn Mâlik al-Ansârî
 Al-Hakam ibn Abi al-As
 Abdullah ibn Abi Bakr
 Al-Qa'qa'a ibn Amr at-Tamimi
 Ammar bin Yasir
 Amr bin Al`âs
 Amr ibn al-Jamuh
 Amru bin Ma'adi Yakrib
 Anas ibn Nadhar
 Anas ibn Mâlik
 An-Nu`aymân ibn `Amr
 An-Nu`mân ibn Muqarrin
 Arbad ibn Humayrah
 As'ad ibn Zurarah
 Al-Arqam ibn-abil-Arqam
 Asmâ' bint Abî Bakr
 Asmâ' bint Umays
 Asim ibn Thabit
 Asim ibn Amr al-Tamimi
 Atika bint Abdul Muttalib
 Atiqa bint Zayd
 Attab ibn Asid
 At-Tufayl ibn Amr ad-Dawsi
 Ayman ibn Ubayd
 Ayyash ibn Abi Rabiah
 Abu Mihjan as Tsaqafi

B 
 Bashir ibn Sa'ad
 Barrah bint al Harith
 
 Bilal ibn Rabah
 Bilal ibn al-Harith
 
 Busr ibn Abi Artat

D 
 Dihyah al-Kalbi
 Dhiraar bin Al-Azwar
 Dhiraar ibn al-Khattab

F 
 Fadl ibn Abbas
 Fatima az-Zahra bint Muhammad
 Fatima bint Al-Aswad
 Fatima bint Asad

 Fayruz ad-Daylami
 Fatimah bint al-Khattab

H 

 Hamza ibn Abd al-Muttalib

 Habab ibn Mundhir

 Habib ibn Zayd al-Ansari

 Habibah binte Ubayd-Allah

 Hafsa bint Umar ibn al-Khattab

 Hakim ibn Hizam

 Halimah bint Abi Dhuayb

 Hammanah bint Jahsh

 Hanzala Ibn Abi Amir

 Harith ibn Hisham

 Harith ibn Rab'i

 Hashim ibn Utbah

 Hassan ibn Thabit

 Hatib bin Abi Balta'ah

 Hind bint Awf 

 Hind bint Utbah

 Hisham ibn al-A'as

 Hudhayfah ibn al-Yaman

 Hujr ibn 'Adi

 Hasan ibn Ali

 Hussein ibn Ali

I 

 Ibrahim ibn Muhammad

 Ikrima ibn Abi Jahl

 Imran ibn Husain

 Iyad ibn Ghanm

J 

 Jaban al-Kurdi

 Jabr

 Jabir ibn Abdullah al-Ansari

 Jafar ibn Abi Talib

 Jamila bint Thabit

 Jubayr ibn Mut'im

 Julaybib

 Jumanah bint Abi Talib

K 

 Ka'b ibn Zuhayr

 Khadijah bint Khuwaylid

 Khalid ibn Sa`id

 Kharija bin Huzafa

 Khawlah bint Hakim

 Khawlah bint al-Azwar

 Khawlah bint Tha'labah

 Khubayb ibn Adiy

 Khunais ibn Hudhafa

 Khuzayma ibn Thabit

 Khabbab ibn al-Aratt

 Al-Khansa

 Khalid ibn al Walid

L 

 Labid ibn Rabi'a

 Layla bint al-Minhal

 Lubaba bint al-Harith

 Lubaynah

M 

 Muawiyah bin Abu Sufyan

 Malik al-Dar

Malik bin Huwairith

 Maria al-Qibtiyya

 Maymuna bint al-Harith

 Malik ibn an-Nadr

 Miqdad ibn al-Aswad

 Mu`adh ibn `Amr

 Mu`adh ibn Jabal

 Mu`awwaz ibn `Amr

 Muhammad ibn Ja'far

 Muhammad ibn Maslamah

 Munabbih ibn Kamil

 Mus`ab ibn `Umair

 Maslama ibn Mukhallad al-Ansari

 Muhammad Ibn Abi Bakr

N 

 Na'ila bint al-Farafisa

 Nadia

 Nauman Nābigha al-Jaʽdī

 Najiyah bint al-Walid

 Nuaym ibn Masud

 Nu'man ibn Bashir al-Ansari

 Nafi ibn al-Harith

 Nufay ibn al-Harith

 Nusaybah bint Ka'ab

 An-Nawwas ibn Sam'an

Q 

 Al-Qa'qa' ibn Amr al-Tamimi

 Qatada ibn al-Nu'man

 Qutaylah bint Abd al-Uzza

 Qutayla ukht al-Nadr

R 

 Rab'ah ibn Umayah

 Rabiah ibn Kab

 Rabi'ah ibn al-Harith

 Ramlah bint Abi Sufyan

 Rayhanah bint Amr

 Rufaida Al-Aslamia

 Ruqayyah bint Muhammad

 Rumaysa bint Milhan

S 

 Sa`sa`a ibn Suhan

 Sa`d ibn Abî Waqâs

 Sa`d ibn ar-Rabi`

 Sa`d ibn Malik

 Sa`d ibn Mu`âdh

 Sa`d ibn Ubadah

 Sabra ibn Ma`bad

 Sa`îd ibn Âmir al-Jumahi

 Sa`îd ibn Zayd

 Safiyyah bint ‘Abd al-Muttalib

 Safiyya bint Huyayy

 Safwan ibn al-Mu‘attal

 Safwan ibn Umayya

 Salama Abu Hashim

 Salama ibn al-Aqwa

 Salim Mawla Abi Hudhayfah

 Salma bint Umays

 Salma bint Sakhri ibn `Amir

 Salman al-Fârisî

 Sahl ibn Sa'd

 Sahl ibn Hunaif

 Sahla bint Suhayl

 Salit bin 'Amr 'Ala bin Hadrami

 Samra ibn Jundab

 Sawdah bint Zam`a

 As-Sakran ibn Amr

 Shams ibn Uthman

 Shadad ibn Aus

 Shurahbil ibn Hasana

 Al-Shifa bint Abdullah

 Sirin bint Sham'un

 Suhayb ar-Rumi

 Suhayl ibn Amr

 Sumayyah bint Khayyat

 Sufyan ibn Awf

 Suraqa bin Malik

 Shuja' ibn Wahab al-Asad

 Sinan Bin Salamah bin Mohbik

T 

 Talhah ibn Ubaydullah

 Tamim Abu Ruqayya

 Tamim al-Ansari

 Tamim al-Dari

 Thabit ibn Qays

 Thumamah ibn Uthal

 Thuwaybah

 Tufail Ibn Amr Ad-Dawsi

U 

 Umar Ibn al-Khattab

 Uthman Ibn Affan

 Ubadah ibn al-Samit

 Ubaydah ibn al-Harith

 Ubayda ibn as-Samit

 Ubayy ibn Ka'b ibn Qays

 Al-Akhnas ibn Shurayq

 Umar ibn Harith

 Umayr ibn Sa'd al-Ansari

 Umayr ibn Wahb

 Umamah bint Zaynab

 Umm Ayman (Baraka bint Tha'laba)

 Umm Hakim

 Umm Hani

 Umm Haram

 Umm Kulthum bint Abi Bakr

 Umm Kulthum bint Asim

 Umm Kulthum bint Muhammad

 Umm Kulthum bint Uqba

 Umm Ma'bad

 Umm Ruman bint `Amir

 Umm Salamah

 Umm Sharik

 Umm Ubays

 Umm ul-Banin

 Ukasha Bin al-Mihsan

 Uqbah ibn Amir

 Urwah ibn Mas'ud

 Usama ibn Zayd

 Utbah ibn Ghazwan

 Utban ibn Malik

 Uthman ibn Hunayf

 Uthman ibn Madh'un

 Uthman ibn Talha

W 

 Wahb ibn Sa'd

 Wahb ibn Umayr

 Wahshi ibn Harb

Wail ibn Hujr

 Walid ibn Uqba

 Walid ibn al Walid

Y 

 Yasir ibn Amir

 Yazid Ibn Abi Sufyaan

Z 

 Zayd al-Khayr

 Zayd ibn al-Khattab

 Zayd ibn Arqam

 Zayd ibn Harithah

 Zayd ibn Thabit

 Zaynab bint Ali

 Zaynab bint Jahsh

 Zaynab bint Khuzayma

 Zaynab bint Muhammad

 Zish Shamalain

 Zubair ibn al-Awam

 Zunairah al-Rumiya

See also 
 List of non-Arab Sahaba
 Sahaba in the Qur'an

References

External links 
 The lives of the Sahaba, by Muhammad Yusuf Kandhelvi.
  Sahaba, by Muhammad bin Ali Al-Shukani
 https://www.islamicfinder.org/

People from Mecca
People from Medina